Guizhaphaenops is a genus of beetles in the family Carabidae, containing the following species:

 Guizhaphaenops baiyinensis Deuve, 2000
 Guizhaphaenops brevioricornis Deuve, 2000
 Guizhaphaenops daheiensis Deuve, 2000
 Guizhaphaenops giganteus Ueno, 2000
 Guizhaphaenops guoquandongensis Deuve, 2001
 Guizhaphaenops lingyunensis Deuve, 2002
 Guizhaphaenops lipsorum Deuve, 2000
 Guizhaphaenops martii Deuve, 2001
 Guizhaphaenops striatus Ueno, 2000
 Guizhaphaenops zhijinensis Ueno & Ran, 2004
 Guizhaphaenops zorzini Vigna Taglianti, 1997

References

Trechinae